Atutahi is an islet in Penrhyn Atoll (Tongareva) in the Cook Islands. It is on the southern edge of the atoll, between Moturakina and Ahu a Miria. The island contains both a marae, Te Rupe-tangi-rekareka, and a stone ellipse.

References

Penrhyn atoll